Gazeran or Gazoran or Gazran may refer to:
 Gazeran, Farahan
 Gazeran, Khondab